The 2011 RBC Bank Women's Challenger was a tennis tournament in Raleigh, North Carolina.
Johanna Konta was the defending champion but chose not to participate. 

Petra Rampre defeated Camila Giorgi in the final 6–3, 6–2.

Seeds

Draw

Finals

Top half

Bottom half

References
Main Draw
Qualifying Singles

RBC Bank Women's Challenger - Singles